The 130th Aviation Regiment is an aviation regiment of the U.S. Army.

Structure
 1st Battalion (Attack Reconnaissance) "Panthers" (NC ARNG)
 Afghanistan 2018 - March 2019
 Company C (AH-64D) (NC ARNG)
 Afghanistan - August 2003 - June 2004 / HQ at Kandahar.
 2nd Battalion (Airfield Operations) (NC ARNG)

References

Citations

Bibliography

130